Paul Muegge (September 28, 1936 – August 16, 2021) was an American politician who served in the Oklahoma Senate from the 20th district from 1990 to 2002.

Muegge graduated from Lamont High School.

He died on August 16, 2021, in Tonkawa, Oklahoma at age 84.

References

1936 births
2021 deaths
Democratic Party Oklahoma state senators
Oklahoma State University alumni
People from Grant County, Oklahoma